The 41st G7 summit was held in Schloss Elmau, Krün, Bavaria and Germany on 7–8 June 2015. In March 2014 the remaining members of the G8 declared that a meaningful discussion was currently not possible with Russia, and since then meetings have continued under the G7 name (not to be confused with the G7 meetings of finance ministers and central bank governors).

Leaders at the summit
The attendees included the leaders of the seven currently active G7 member states, as well as representatives of the European Union. The President of the European Commission is a permanently welcome participant in all meetings and decision-making since 1981.

The 41st G7 summit was the last summit for Canadian Prime Minister Stephen Harper. It was also the first summit for Donald Tusk and Jean-Claude Juncker.

Participants

Agenda

The German G7 presidency announced the following agenda:

Key topics for the summit
The G7 Summit 2015 in Schloss Elmau will focus on the global economy as well as on key issues regarding foreign, security and development policy. Additionally the UN conferences to be held in 2015 as well as the post-2015 agenda will be discussed.

Other key issues they will be addressing include
 Protection of the marine environment, marine governance and resource efficiency,
 Antibiotic resistance, Ebola, neglected and poverty-related diseases,
 Retail and supply chain standards, and
 Empowering self-employed women and women in vocational training.

The leaders of the G7 countries will also discuss energy security, including as part of the Rome G7 Energy Initiative. The G7 Energy Initiative for Energy Security was launched at a meeting of the energy ministers of the G7 countries held in Rome in May 2014, at which agreement was reached on more joint measures to boost energy security. The leaders of the G7 countries then approved the principles of and measures under the Rome G7 Energy Initiative at their summit in June 2014.

In addition, they will continue the ongoing G7 process in regard to development policy.

A community of shared values
The G7 countries have a special responsibility when it comes to shaping our planet's future. As a community of shared values, the G7 must work towards establishing peace and security and ensuring people can live a self-determined life. Freedom and human rights, democracy and the rule of law, peace and security, prosperity and sustainable development are core principles agreed by the G7.
"The heads of state and government of the G7 do not accept the Russian Federation’s illegal annexation of Crimea. As a community of values, they have therefore decided to hold their meetings without Russia until further notice."

Foreign and security policy
The G7's commitment to pursue a common foreign and security policy is extremely important given the numerous political crises the world over. In March 2014 the G7 declared that a meaningful discussion was currently not possible with Russia in the context of the G8. Since then meetings have continued within the G7 process.

On 15 April 2015, the Foreign Ministers included in their final communiqué a considerable amount of international crises and common challenges the international community is currently facing. Special attention was also paid to the issue of Climate and Security. The Ministers welcomed the external study "A New Climate for Peace: Taking Action on Climate and Fragility Risks", which "analyses the compound risks of climate change on fragile states and regions, identifies critical pathways through which climate change is likely to have significant interactions with the stability and fragility of states and societies, and recommends that G7 governments should align their efforts toward the common goal of increasing resilience and reducing fragility in the face of global climate change."

Sustainable economic growth and free trade
The G7 countries are key actors in international economic relations, and as such they carry great responsibility for creating reliable, sustainable and viable global economic conditions. Dynamic and sustainable growth in industrialised, newly industrialising and developing countries is easier to achieve if those countries are agreed on basic issues around economic development, cross-border trade and an effective, prudent financial market architecture.
That is why the G7 will continue to work towards establishing an enabling environment that is stable in the long term in order to promote dynamic, sustainable economic growth. Sound finances, open global markets and a well-functioning labour market have a key role to play in that. The G7 states will together continue to promote international trade.

Dialogue with civil society
The leaders of the G7 intend to support African nations in their reform efforts and thus to lay the foundations for peace and security, growth and sustainable development on the African continent. That is why they will be inviting the heads of state and government primarily of African countries to join them on the second day of the summit. Together with them they will engage in a wide-ranging dialogue on Africa and global policy issues.
The German Chancellor also plans to hold an inclusive dialogue with civil society in the context of Germany's G7 Presidency. As part of an outreach process Angela Merkel will meet representatives of the scientific community, business and trade unions, as well as non-governmental organisations and young people from the G7 countries.

Schedule of meetings

The following meetings of ministers were planned in the run-up to the summit in Schloss Elmau:

Gallery

Guest invitees (countries)

Guest invitees (organizations)

See also
 Group of Seven (G7)
 List of G8 summits
 List of G20 summits

References

External links

 G-7 2015 Official Homepage
 G7/G8 Info Centre - University of Toronto

2015 conferences
2015 in Bavaria
2015 in international relations
21st-century diplomatic conferences (Global)
Diplomatic conferences in Germany
2015
June 2015 events in Germany